Wojciech Załuski (born 22 February 1963) is a former motorcycle speedway rider from Poland. He was the 1989 Polish champion.

Career 
Załuski came to prominence in 1984, when he won the Polish Junior Individual Speedway Championship.

He became the champion of Poland after he won gold at the Polish Individual Speedway Championship in 1989. He also won the prestigious Golden Helmet during the 1989 Polish speedway season.

He rode for his home club of Kolejarz Opole from 1981 to 1991. During 1991, he represented Poland in the 1991 Speedway World Pairs Championship.

He joined Sparta Wrocław for five seasons from 1992 to 1997 and won the Team Speedway Polish Championship on three occasions. He then joined Wybrzeże Gdańsk for two seasons before returning to Opole in 1999, where he saw out the end of his career in 2002.

World final appearances

World Pairs
 1991 -  Poznań, Olimpia Stadium Poznań (with Ryszard Dołomisiewicz & Piotr Świst - 7th - 9pts (1)

References 

1963 births
Living people
Polish speedway riders